Talang 2009 was the third season of the talent show Talang, the Swedish version of Got Talent. Talang 2009 had its premiere on April 3, 2009. The winner of the show was 30-year-old magician Charlie Caper, and 12-year-old piano player David Movsesian came runner-up. This season was hosted by Markoolio and Tobbe Blom, and the judges were: Bert Karlsson, Charlotte Perrelli and Johan Pråmell.

List of those who made it to the final audition

Episode 1 (Kalmar) 

Broadcast on Friday, April 3.
Max Carling - walking on tightrope
The Rockettes - vocal trio
Eamonn O’Reily - troubadour
Pernilla Ingvarsdotter - opera
Ingo - magician playing cards
Erik Linder - singing
Beatbox Libban - beatboxing
Elin Wennström - singing
Pos från skogen - rockband
Aari Haatainen - accordion
Cirkus Saga - circus tricks
Lasse Nachtweij - juggling on unicycle
Santiago "Kouki" Obama - dance

Episode 2 (Stockholm)

Broadcast on Friday, April 10.
Vincente Opera - magic suitcase
Anastassia Johansson - rhythmic gymnastics
Whiplash - dance
Clara Hagman - singing
BoBBo - juggling
The Goose - singing
The Hebbe Sisters - singing
Duchess Dubois - burlesque striptease
Axel Adlercreutz - tricks
Alexander & Daniel Lindman - fakir tricks
David Hammarberg - circus tricks
Splash - dance
Electrified - singing and dancing
The Untitled Quartet - singing

Episode 3 (Stockholm)

Broadcast on Friday, April 17.
Marcus Wiander - kong
Börje & Jimmy - cage and card magic
Lennart Bång - spoken word
Stardogs - dog tricks
Ludde van Halen - guitar
Alexander Mood - singing
Knäckebrödsdansen - naked dancing
Niclas Christoffer - stand up
David Movsesian - piano
Emma Berglund - singing
Christoffer Skoog - singing
Charlie Caper - magic
Daniel Samuelsson - juggling
Tomas Lundman - football tricks
Manda - acrobatics
Emma Risbo - singing

Episode 4 (Kalmar)

Broadcast on Friday, April 24
Magnus Kviske - singing like an LP
Rebecka Karlsson - singing
Oliver Cartea - magic
Agge - singing
Tobias Chilli - card tricks and acrobatics
Ken Waegas - Elvis imitation
C-G & Blåljus - singing
Blomman & Olsson - singing
Tuta & Kör - child gymnastics and singing
Christoffer Daun - singing
Emelia Persson - singing
Mikael Persson - singing and ukulele
Julie Hansson - singing

Episode 5 (Göteborg)

Broadcast on Friday, May 8.
Victor Pettersson - singing
Flammable - hardrock band
Linda Karlsson Johbarn – singing and music
Erika Selin - singing
Damorkeztern – singing
Team Magic – magic
Peehigh – rap
Bröderna Fröidh – humor songs
Andreas Lindkvist – cycling
Riku Koponen – card magic
VLO – ball tricks
Brynolf & Ljung – breakout
Erik Martinson – singing and ukulele

Episode 6 (Stockholm)

Broadcast on Friday, May 15.
Martin Kjellgren - talking with children voice
Julle United Allstars - cheerleeding dance
Jakob Stenberg - counting letters in words
Men - singing group
Rainbow Sisters - drag show
Smash Into Pieces - rockband
Akira - dance
Malin Jakobsson - spoken word
Redeemer - singing piano
Sharon - singing

List of those who advanced to the semifinals

Semifinal 1 
Broadcast on Friday, May 22.
Whiplash - dance
Emma Risbo - singing
Max Carling - circus tricks
Victor Pettersson - singing
Börje & Jimmy - magic with gorilla
Men - singing group
Nastja - rhythmic gymnastics
Lennart Bång - spoken word

In the finals:
Victor Pettersson - singing (viewers' favorite)
Men - singing group (judges' favorite)

Semifinal 2
Broadcast on Friday, May, 29.
Julle United Allstars - cheerleeding dance
David Movsesian - piano
Vincente Opera - magic
Malin Jakobsson - spoken word
Blomman & Olsson - singing and guitar
Alexander & Daniel Lindman - fakir tricks
The Hebbe Sisters - singing
Charlie Caper - magic

In the finals:
Charlie Caper - magic (viewers' favorite)
David Movsesian - piano (judges' favorite)

Semifinal 3
Broadcast on Friday, June 5.
Stardogs - dog tricks
Erik Linder - singing
Electrified - singing and dancing
Martin Kjellgren - talking with children voice
Julie Hansson - singing
Brynolf & Ljung - magic
C-G & Blåljus - singing
Akira - dancing

In the finals:
Akira - dance (viewers' favorite)
Brynolf & Ljung - magic (judges' favorite)

Wildcards
Erik Linder - singing (viewers' wildcard)
Nastja - gymnastics (judges' wildcard)

References

Talang (Swedish TV series)
2009 Swedish television seasons